Vinogradov is a Russian surname.

Vinogradov (with variant spellings) may also refer to:

 Mons Vinogradov, lunar mountains named after Alexander Pavlovich Vinogradov
 Vinogradov (crater), Martian impact crater
 Vinogradov Fracture Zone, Antarctic undersea fracture zone 
 Vynohradiv, city in Western Ukraine
 Russian destroyer Admiral Vinogradov, Udaloy-class destroyer of the Russian Navy

See also
 Bombieri–Vinogradov theorem, in math
 Vinogradov's theorem, in math
 Vinogradov's jerboa, a rodent species in the family Dipodidae 
 Vinogradov's jird, a rodent species in the family Muridae